A Birney is a small streetcar. See also: Birney (Toronto streetcar).

'Birney may also refer to:

Places
Birney, Montana, United States

People
 Alice Birney
 David Birney (1939–2022), American actor/director
 David B. Birney
 Earle Birney
 Ewan Birney
 Jack Birney
 James G. Birney
 James M. Birney
 Matt Birney
 Reed Birney
 William Birney